Dame Elizabeth Neville, DBE, QPM, DL,  (born 5 February 1953) was the High Sheriff of Wiltshire for 2010. and former Chief Constable of Wiltshire.

Career
Neville was appointed Chief Constable of Wiltshire in 1997 and retired from the force on 17 September 2004. She was only the second woman chief constable in the United Kingdom, and the youngest in the rank at that time. She is a Deputy Lieutenant for Wiltshire.

She is or has also been:
 Member of Regulatory Decisions Committee of the Financial Conduct Authority (former)
 Member of Determinations Panel for the Pensions Regulator (former)
 Non-Executive Director of The Insolvency Service (former)
 An Independent Adjudicator of Companies House (current)
 Lay Member of the Independent Appeals Body for Phone-paid Service Authority (current) 
 Appeal Officer for Community Interest Companies (current)
 Trustee Wiltshire & Swindon Community Foundation (former)
 Trustee Wiltshire Bobby Van Trust (former)
 Vice Chair of Board of Trustees of Cumberland Lodge (former)
 Non-Executive Director of the Serious Fraud Office (former)
 Member of the Civil Nuclear Police Authority (former)
 Member of the Police Appeals Tribunal (former)
 Complaints Assessor for the Agencies of the Department for Transport (former)
 Independent Complaints Adjudicator for the Assets Recovery Agency (former)
 Director of Ajay Shopfit Maintenance Ltd (former)
 Vice chair of Board of Governors Stonar School (former)

References

External links
Swindon Link
Government Appointments

1953 births
Living people
British Chief Constables
Dames Commander of the Order of the British Empire
Deputy Lieutenants of Wiltshire
English recipients of the Queen's Police Medal
People from Devizes
British women police officers
High Sheriffs of Wiltshire
Alumni of St Hilda's College, Oxford